Nagymányok is a town in , Hungary.

References 

Populated places in Tolna County